Badiali is a surname. Notable people with the surname include:

Cesare Badiali (1810–1865), Italian baritone opera singer
Giuseppe Badiali (1797–after 1850), Italian painter and scenic designer

Italian-language surnames